Goxhill Hall is a late 17th-century residence and a Grade II* Listed building in Goxhill, North Lincolnshire. A 14th to 15th-century Medieval hall joins onto the north-east corner of Goxhill Hall. This earlier structure was part of a larger complex and is a Grade I Listed building.

History and design
The hall was built between 1690 and 1705 for Henry Hildyard and was renovated in the late 20th century. It is constructed in two storeys of red brick with blue brick dressing with a pantile roof and a 5-bay frontage.

References

17th-century establishments in England
Buildings and structures in Lincolnshire
Grade II* listed buildings in North Lincolnshire